Krzysztof Danielewicz (born 26 July 1991) is a Polish footballer who plays as a central midfielder for Stal Rzeszów.

Honours
Stal Rzeszów
II liga: 2021–22

External links

References

1991 births
Living people
Association football midfielders
Polish footballers
Ekstraklasa players
I liga players
II liga players
III liga players
MKS Cracovia (football) players
Ruch Radzionków players
Zagłębie Lubin players
Śląsk Wrocław players
Górnik Łęczna players
Chojniczanka Chojnice players
Miedź Legnica players
Warta Poznań players
MKP Pogoń Siedlce players
Stal Rzeszów players
Sportspeople from Wrocław